Sucrose alpha-glucosidase (sucrose alpha-glucohydrolase, sucrase, sucrase-isomaltase, sucrose.alpha.-glucohydrolase, intestinal sucrase, sucrase(invertase)) is an enzyme with systematic name sucrose-alpha-D-glucohydrolase. This enzyme catalyses the following chemical reaction

 Hydrolysis of sucrose and maltose by an alpha-D-glucosidase-type action

This enzyme is isolated from intestinal mucosa as a single polypeptide chain. The human sucrase-isomaltase is a dual-function enzyme with two GH31 domains, one serving as the isomaltase, the other serving as a sucrose alpha-glucosidase.

References

External links 
 

EC 3.2.1